P&O European Ferries (formerly Townsend Thoresen), a division of P&O Ferries, was a ferry company which operated in the English Channel from 1987 after the Herald of Free Enterprise disaster, when Townsend Thoresen was renamed P&O European Ferries, until 1999 when the Portsmouth Operations became P&O Portsmouth and the Dover Operations were merged with Stena Line AB to make P&O Stena Line.

History
P&O European Ferries was formed after the Townsend Thoresen ship, Herald of Free Enterprise, capsized outside Zeebrugge in 1987.  P&O owned the whole of European Group who marketed their ferry services as Townsend Thoresen.  After the bad publicity that the Zeebrugge disaster brought to the brand P&O quickly rebranded Townsend Thoresen as P&O European Ferries with all of the former TT fleet, all of the vessels received the Blue P&O hull and blue funnel.

In 1993 P&O launched a new Portsmouth to Bilbao route using the former Olympia and renamed her the Pride of Bilbao. In 1994 when Olau Line ceased operations the 2 German built superferries Olau Britannia and Olau Hollandia were chartered to P&O and they were both renamed the Pride of Portsmouth and the Pride of Le Havre respectively.  The new Pride of Le Havre replaced the first ship of that name which was renamed Pride of Cherbourg and replaced the original Pride of Cherbourg on the Portsmouth - Cherbourg route.

In 1998 P&O European Ferries Dover operations and Stena Line's Dover & Newhaven operations merged and became P&O Stena Line with P&O European Ferries putting forward their Dover - Calais and Dover - Zeebrugge route vessels forward and P&O Irish Sea was formed in 1998, following the merger of the Cairnryan-based service of P&O European Ferries (Felixstowe) Ltd and Pandoro (who operated routes between England, Scotland and France to Ireland), while the Portsmouth operations remained unchanged until 1999 when it became P&O Portsmouth.

Past fleet

Routes
 Dover - Calais
 Dover - Zeebrugge
 Portsmouth - Le Havre
 Portsmouth - Cherbourg
 Portsmouth - Bilbao
 Cairnryan - Larne
 Felixstowe - Rotterdam (Europort)
 Felixstowe - Zeebrugge

References

Notes

Bibliography

European Ferries
Defunct shipping companies of the United Kingdom
Ferry companies of England
Ferry companies of France
History of the English Channel